Zeller Ache is a river of Upper Austria.

The Zeller Ache is the outflow of the lake Irrsee. From there it flows into the Mondsee which is drained by the Seeache.

References

Rivers of Upper Austria
Rivers of Austria